The Church of Jesus Christ of Latter-day Saints in South Dakota refers to the Church of Jesus Christ of Latter-day Saints (LDS Church) and its members in South Dakota. The official church membership as a percentage of general population was 1.27% in 2014. According to the 2014 Pew Forum on Religion & Public Life survey, less than 1% of South Dakotans self-identify themselves most closely with the LDS Church. The LDS Church is the 8th largest denomination in South Dakota.

History

The first Anglo-Saxons to settle in what is now South Dakota affiliated themselves with the LDS Church and settled at Fort Vermillion in 1845 to 1846. These settlers, among others, were sent to explore locations that would be suitable for a new home for the LDS Church as they experienced persecutions in Nauvoo, Missouri, and other areas further east.

The number of missionaries from the church sent to the Dakotas doubled during the pandemic.

Stakes
As of February 2023, the following stakes had congregations located in South Dakota:

Missions
The former South Dakota Rapid City Mission was renamed the North Dakota Bismarck Mission in 2015.

Temples
As of May 2021, congregations in the Sioux Falls South Dakota and the Sioux City Iowa stakes are in the Winter Quarters Nebraska Temple district. Congregations in the Rapid City South Dakota and the two North Dakota stakes shown above are in the Bismarck North Dakota Temple district.

See also

Religion in South Dakota

References

External links
 Newsroom (South Dakota)
 Deseret News 2010 Church Almanac (South Dakota)
 ComeUntoChrist.org Latter-day Saints Visitor site
 The Church of Jesus Christ of Latter-day Saints Official site

Christianity in South Dakota
Latter Day Saint movement in South Dakota
South Dakota